"Jump" is a song by American rapper DaBaby featuring YoungBoy Never Broke Again, released on April 17, 2020, as the eighth track from YoungBoy's second studio album, Blame It on Baby. The bouncy trap beat sees DaBaby and YoungBoy going back and forth about their success.

Composition
The song is built around a heavy baseline which builds the melody for both DaBaby and YoungBoy. DJ K.i.D and Rocco Did It Again! use squeaky and electronic instrumentals to enhance the song's trap beat.

Critical reception
HipHopDXs Scott Glaysher noted that the song "isn't easy on the ears" and "sounds like a chaotic carnival of bad rhymes and even worse ad-libs." Listing it as one of the most forward on the album, Pitchforks Dani Blum notes that the track is "familiarly propulsive," however it shows "YoungBoy Never Broke Again doing his best DaBaby impression."

Music video
The song's official music video - released on side of the audio - sees DaBaby and YoungBoy Never Broke Again taking influence from the COVID-19 pandemic as Baby and YB are seen heavily cleaning and sanitizing the house in which the video is recorded in. The Reel Goats-directed video sees the two artists practicing social distancing while dancing and rapping the tune, "jump[ing]" around.

Charts

Certifications

References

2020 songs
DaBaby songs
Songs written by DaBaby
YoungBoy Never Broke Again songs
Songs written by YoungBoy Never Broke Again
Interscope Records singles